Philipp Amthor (born 10 November 1992) is a German politician of the Christian Democratic Union (CDU) who has been serving as a member of the Bundestag since the 2017 German federal election.

Education and early career 
Amthor was born 1992 in Ueckermünde and grew up in Torgelow. He studied law at the University of Greifswald, on a scholarship of the Konrad Adenauer Foundation (KAS). From 2017 to 2020, he worked as a research associate at the Berlin office of White & Case.

Political career 
Amthor joined the CDU in 2008. In the 2017 elections he became member of the Bundestag as the directly elected MP for the Mecklenburgische Seenplatte I – Vorpommern-Greifswald II constituency. In parliament, he has since been serving on the Committee on Internal Affairs (since 2018) and the Committee on European Affairs (2018–2021). Since the 2021 elections, Amthor has been serving as his parliamentary group's spokesperson for state modernization.

Since 2018, Amthor has been the treasurer of the Young Union (JU), making him part of the organization's leadership around chairman Tilman Kuban.

Following the resignation of Vincent Kokert as chairman of the CDU in Mecklenburg-Vorpommern, Amthor announced his candidacy for the role. Amid growing criticism of his lobbying activities on behalf of a private company, he declared in June 2020 that he would not run for the party's leadership in the state anymore.

Other activities 
 Augustus Intelligence, Member of the Board of Directors (2019-2020)
 Atlantik-Brücke, Member

Political positions 

Ahead of the Christian Democrats' leadership election in 2018, Amthor publicly endorsed Jens Spahn to succeed Angela Merkel as the party's chair. He later endorsed Friedrich Merz as Annegret Kramp-Karrenbauer's successor at the party's 2021 leadership election.

Amthor is considered part of the conservative wing of the CDU, having come out against gender mainstreaming, abortion and the legalisation of same-sex marriage.

Public personality 

Amthor's eccentric personality, dated speech and conservative political positions, in contrast to his youthful age, have led to him being dubbed "the oldest 26-year-old in Germany", and has made him the subject of significant public mockery and online memes. He is particularly known for his frequent use of the word Schabernack, a word that approximately translates to "jokery" or "foolishness", and which was nominated for the 2020 German Youth Word of the Year

References

External links

1992 births
Living people
People from Ueckermünde
Members of the Bundestag for Mecklenburg-Western Pomerania
University of Greifswald alumni
Members of the Bundestag 2017–2021
Members of the Bundestag 2021–2025
Members of the Bundestag for the Christian Democratic Union of Germany